Jaroslaw Padoch (as an author of articles in "Encyclopedia of Ukraine" as Yaroslav Padoch) (December 14, 1908, Buchach, Kingdom of Galicia and Lodomeria, now Ternopil Oblast, Ukraine — August 28, 1998, New York City, United States) — was one of the most important Ukrainian scientist, lawyer, journalist, editor and public figure.  
Member of Shevchenko Scientific Society. President of Shevchenko Scientific Society in United States and President of Shevchenko Scientific Society's the World Council in 1982-1992.

He was buried at the cemetery of St. Andrew the First-Called Apostle in So. Bound Brook, N.J.

Jaroslaw Padoch had a wife Iryna and two daughters: Maya and Christina. Christina (Christine) Padoch is the author of a book "Migration and its alternatives among the Iban of Sarawak" (1982).

Works 
Author of such articles in the Encyclopedia of Ukraine:
 Ruskaia Pravda. // Encyclopedia of Ukraine. Vol. 4. 1993.
 With Andrii Yakovliv, Boyars in the Encyclopedia of Ukraine, vol. 1 (1984).
 Chubaty, Mykola in the Internet Encyclopedia of Ukraine

References

Sources 
  Х. Весна, Б. Головин. Падох Ярослав Миколайович // Тернопільський енциклопедичний словник : у 4 т. / редкол.: Г. Яворський та ін. — Тернопіль : Видавничо-поліграфічний комбінат «Збруч», 2008. — Т. 3 : П — Я. — 708 с. — C. 12. .

People from Buchach